Lucky Romance is a 2016 South Korean television series based on the webtoon of the same name published in 2014 on Naver, starring Hwang Jung-eum and Ryu Jun-yeol. It aired on MBC TV's Wednesdays and Thursdays at 22:00 (KST) timeslot from May 25 to July 14, 2016.

Synopsis
The drama centers on the romantic and comedic interactions between Shim Bo-nui, a woman who has blind faith in superstitions and fortune-tellings, with Je Soo-ho, CEO of a Game developer company who is a scientific and logical man.

Cast

Main
Hwang Jung-eum as Shim Bo-nui
 Lee Ye-seon as child Bo-nui
 Park Seo-yeon as young Bo-nui
A 26-year-old, attractive woman, who can learn quickly. On the other hand, she is blindly superstitious. She always follows the fortune-tellings of shaman Goo Shin, because she is told she was born unlucky. The shaman tells her that in order to save her sister Bo-ra, she has to sleep with a man born in the year of the Tiger. She meets Je Soo-ho and coincidentally he was born a Tiger.
Ryu Jun-yeol as Je Soo-ho
Gil Jeong-woo as child Soo-ho
Seol Woo-hyung as young Soo-ho
A 31-year-old man. Born as a genius, he is a very logical and scientific person, who does not believe in anything supernatural. He is the owner and also CEO of a game developer company, Zeze Factory. He meets Bo-nui, who asks him to sleep with her. 
Lee Soo-hyuk as Choi Geon-wook / Gary Choi
Hong Dong-young as young Geon-wook
A 24-year-old man. A Korean with Canadian citizenship. He is a famous professional tennis player, always placed high in ATP rankings. When he returns to South Korea, he immediately searches for his first love Bo-nui. He has a strained relationship with his father.
Lee Chung-ah as Han Seol-hee / Amy Han
A 34-year-old woman. The director of a big sport company that represents Gun-wook. She is Soo-ho's first love. Ever since she lost her older brother in a fire accident, she never shows her true feelings to anyone, and always strives to be perfect in everyone's eyes.

Supporting 
People around Shim Bo-nui
Kim Ji-min as Shim Bo-ra
Kim Bo-min as young Bo-ra
Kim Jong-goo as Goo Shin
Kim Sang-ho as Won Dae-hae

People around Je Soo-ho
Jung Sang-hoon as Han Ryang-ha
Gi Ju-bong as Je Mool-po
Na Young-hee as Yang Hee-ae
Jung In-gi as Ahn Young-il

People around Choi Geon-wook
 as Choi Ho

Zeze Factory
Lee Cho-hee as Lee Dal-nim
 as Song Dae-gwon
 as Lee Hyun-bin
 as Ryu Ji-hoon
Cha Se-young as Ga Seung-hyun
Kwon Hyuk-soo as Jo Yoon-bal

Extended cast
Jo Seon-mook
Song Kyung-hwa
Jo Shi-nae
Baek Ji-won
Oh Hee-joon

Cameo appearances
Kim Young-hee

Park Sung-kwang
Heo Kyung-hwan

Original soundtrack

OST Part 1

OST Part 2

OST Part 3

OST Part 4

OST Part 5

OST Part 6

OST Part 7

Ratings

Awards and nominations

References

External links
 

Korean-language television shows
2016 South Korean television series debuts
2016 South Korean television series endings
MBC TV television dramas
South Korean romantic comedy television series
Television shows based on South Korean webtoons
Television series by Studio Santa Claus Entertainment